Sondernach is a commune in the Haut-Rhin département in Grand Est in north-eastern France.

Geography
Located in the parc naturel régional des Ballons des Vosges, the village of Sondernach shares with Mittlach the benefit of being situated on the slopes of a large valley watered by one of the streams forming the river Fecht. The altitude of the centre is between 500 and 600 metres.

Its only immediate neighbour is the commune of Metzeral to the north.

Origin of name
The origin of the village's name is unclear. It could be from der Sonne nahe meaning "near the sun", or zum sundern Ach meaning "near the south stream", Sondernach being the furthest south village in the valley.

History
Sondernach first appears in archives in the 12th century. Around 1240, the Benedictine Abbey of Munster owned lands in the village. From 1287, the village was made part of the valley community grouping Munster and the ten communes of the Fecht. It was destroyed during the First World War, during the battle of Metzeral, in June 1915.

See also
 Communes of the Haut-Rhin department

References

Further reading
 

Communes of Haut-Rhin